The British Comic Awards (BCA) were a set of British awards for achievement in comic books. Winners were selected by a judging committee; the awards were given out on an annual basis from 2012 to 2016 for comics made by United Kingdom creators published from September of the previous year until September of the current year. Award presentations were held at the Leeds Thought Bubble Festival, in the fall of the year.

The British Comic Award took the place of the National Comics Awards (1997–2003) and the Eagle Awards, both of which had petered out by the early 2010s.

Overview 
The British Comic Awards were given out in five categories:
 Best Book — "for long-form comics and collections"
 Best Comic — "for short-form, self-contained stories"
 Young People's Comic Award — "for short and long-form comics suitable for children voted for by young people"
 Emerging Talent — "to recognize irrepressible talent and potential in a young or new creator"
 Hall of Fame — "to commemorate the career and legacy of an influential figure from Britain’s rich comic history"

Award recipients — except the Hall of Fame winner — were selected from a list of five nominees in each category. Before the nominees were whittled down to five, the BCA committee would release a longlist of eligible books, comics, and people. Nominations were accepted from the general public via a form on the BCA website.

The BCA committee, which changed slightly each year, was made up of from seven to nine British individuals from academia and the arts. Committee members at various times included Lisa Wood, Maura McHugh, Jamillah Knowles, and Andi Oliver. The BCA committee chose that year's Hall of Fame recipient.

The judging committee changed every year; it generally had five to seven members. Judges at various times included Eddie Argos, Kate Beaton, Hunt Emerson, John Freeman, Lenny Henry, Jessica Hynes, Danny John-Jules, Jamillah Knowles, Graham Linehan, Josie Long, Sarah McIntyre, Scroobius Pip, Jonathan Ross, Roger Sabin, and Stephen Holland of the Nottingham-based comics retailer Page 45.

The Young People’s Comic Award was not selected by the BCA judges; it was chosen by children from a selection of British schools and libraries.

History
The Awards were founded in 2012 by Adam Cadwell. There were some complaints after the first set of nominations were announced that the Awards seemed to favor alternative and independent titles rather than "mainstream" British comics like 2000 AD, The Beano, and The Dandy.

For the 2015 awards, the BCA opened a call for nominations from the general public, which could be submitted through its website; at that point, the Awards also partnered with the Nottingham-based comics retailer Page 45. The 2015 awards were managed by BCA Founder Adam Cadwell.

The 2016 awards were co-sponsored by the Thought Bubble Festival and the Leeds Library & Information Service; they were limited to the Young People's Comic Award only. The nominated titles were sent to over a dozen schools across Leeds and throughout the country for young readers to read and judge. Their winning title was revealed at a special ceremony on 4 November in Leeds as part of the 10th anniversary of Thought Bubble; over 100 of the young judges were in attendance.

Following the 2016 awards, it was announced that the British Comic Awards were "on hiatus" and would return, but in the years since they have disappeared.

Awards
 Winners listed by year; for some categories, other nominees are listed after the winner.

Best Book
 2012: Nelson, edited by Rob Davis and Woodrow Phoenix
 Don Quixote: Volume 1 by Rob Davis
 Goliath by Tom Gauld
 Hilda and the Midnight Giant by Luke Pearson
 Science Tales by Darryl Cunningham
 2013: The Nao of Brown by Glyn Dillon
 The Gigantic Beard That Was Evil by Stephen Collins
 Judge Dredd: Trifecta by Al Ewing, Rob Williams, Simon Spurrier, Henry Flint, D’Israeli, Carl Critchlow, and Simon Coleby
 The Man Who Laughs by David Hine and Mark Stafford. Adapted from the novel by Victor Hugo.
 Mrs. Weber’s Omnibus by Posy Simmonds
 2014: The Encyclopedia of Early Earth by Isabel Greenberg
 The Absence by Martin Stiff
 Celeste by I. N. J. Culbard
 Lighter Than My Shadow by Katie Green
 Sally Heathcote: Suffragette by Mary Talbot, Kate Charlesworth, and Bryan Talbot
 2015: The Motherless Oven by Rob Davis
 Comic Book Slumber Party: Fairytales for Bad Bitches by Hannah Chapman (editor)
 Supercrash: How to Hijack the Global Economy by Darryl Cunningham
 The Rabbi by Rachael Smith
 Tim Ginger by Julian Hanshaw

Best Comic 
 2012: Bad Machinery: The Case of The Fire Inside by John Allison
 The Accidental Salad by Joe Decie
 Girl & Boy by Andrew Tunney
 Hemlock by Josceline Fenton
 Tuk Tuk by Will Kirkby
 2013: Winter's Knight: Day One by Robert M. Ball
 The Absence #5 by Martin Stiff
 The Listening Agent by Joe Decie
 Mud Man #6 by Paul Grist
 Soppy #2 by Philippa Rice
 2014:The Wicked + The Divine #1 by Kieron Gillen, Jamie McKelvie, Matt Wilson, and Clayton Cowles
 Dangeritis: A Fistful of Danger by Robert M. Ball and Warwick Johnson-Cadwell
 In The Frame by Tom Humberstone
 Raygun Roads by Owen Michael Johnson, Indio!, Mike Stock, and Andy Bloor
 Tall Tales & Outrageous Adventures #1: The Snow Queen & Other Stories by Isabel Greenberg
 2015: Grey Area: From the City to the Sea by Tim Bird
 Beast Wagon #1 by Owen Michael Johnson, John Pearson, and Colin Bell
 Hand Me Down by Kristyna Baczynski
 Lost Property by Andy Poyiadgi
 Strip by Sarah Gordon

Young People's Comic Award 
 2012: Hilda and the Midnight Giant by Luke Pearson
 Bad Machinery: The Case of The Fire Inside by John Allison
 Dinopopolous by Nick Edwards
 Gum Girl volume 1: Catastrophe Calling by Andi Watson
 The Lost Boy by Kate Brown
 2013: The Complete Rainbow Orchid by Garen Ewing
 Cindy & Biscuit #3 by Dan White
 Hilda & The Bird Parade by Luke Pearson
 Playing Out by Jim Medway
 The Sleepwalkers by Vivianne Schwarz
 2014: Hilda and the Black Hound by Luke Pearson
 Bad Machinery Vol 2: The Case of The Good Boy by John Allison
 BOO! by Paul Harrison-Davies, Andrew Waugh, Warwick Johnson-Cadwell, Jonathan Edwards, James Howard, Gary Northfield, and Jamie Smart
 Corpse Talk: Season 1 by Adam Murphy
 The Beginner’s Guide to Being Outside by Gill Hatcher
 2015: Star Cat: Book 01 by James Turner
 Cindy and Biscuit Vol 1: We Love Trouble by Dan White
 Gary's Garden: Book 1 by Gary Northfield
 Ghost Cat’s Pedigree Chums by Craig Conlan
 Maleficium by EdieOP
 2016: Lost Tales by Adam Murphy with Lisa Murphy
 Mega Robo Bros by Neill Cameron with Lisa Murphy
 Parsley Girl: Carrots by Matthew Swan
 Tamsin and the Deep by Neill Cameron and Kate Brown
 Zorse by Ramzee with Liz Greenfield

Emerging Talent 
 2012: Josceline Fenton
 Kristyna Baczynski
 Will Kirkby
 Louis Roskosch
 Jack Teagle
 2013: Will Morris for The Silver Darlings
 Isabel Greenberg for The River of Lost Souls
 Dilraj Mann for Frank Ocean VS Chris Brown, Make You Notice, and Turning Point
 Jade Sarson for Cafe Suada: Cup 3 – Strange Stains
 Lizzy Stewart for Solo, Four Days In Brussels, Four Days in Iceland, and Object Stories
 2014: Alison Sampson for her artwork in Genesis (Image Comics) and "Shadows" from the In The Dark anthology (IDW Publishing)
 Briony May Smith for Tam Lin, The Courting of Fair Spring, and Red-Nosed Frost and The Mermaid
 Rachael Smith for House Party, One Good Thing, Flimsy, Vicky Park (a weekly comic in the Leicester Mercury), and "The Amazing Seymore" from the Moose Kid Comics anthology
 Becca Tobin for Eye Contact, "Peppermint Butler's Peppermint Bark" from Adventure Time #30 (Boom! Studios), and numerous short comics
 Corban Wilkin for Breaker's End
 2015: Rachael Stott for her artwork in Doctor Who: The Twelfth Doctor – SDCC Exclusive (Titan Comics), Star Trek #46 and #47 (IDW Publishing), and Star Trek/Planet of the Apes #1-5 (IDW).
 Sarah Graley for Our Super Adventure, Pizza Witch, and Rent Quest
 Matt Taylor for The Great Salt Lake and his artwork on Wolf #1 and #2 (Image Comics)
 Adam Vian for Long Lost Lempi and Snippets: Extracts from 4 Comics that Don’t Exist
 Christian Ward for his artwork on ODY-C Volume 1 and ODY-C #6 (Image Comics)

Hall of Fame 
 2012: Raymond Briggs
 2013: Leo Baxendale
 2014: Posy Simmonds
 2015: Dudley D. Watkins

See also
 Ally Sloper Award
 Eagle Award
 National Comics Awards
 UK Comic Art Award

References 

Comics awards
British awards
Awards established in 2012
Awards disestablished in 2016